The Phoenix Dwarf is a dwarf irregular galaxy discovered in 1976 by Hans-Emil Schuster and Richard Martin West and mistaken for a globular cluster. It is currently 1.44 Mly away from Earth. Its name comes from the fact that it is part of the Phoenix constellation.

Characteristics 
The Phoenix Dwarf has an inner part of young stars which is stretched in an east-west direction and an outer part of mainly old stars that is stretched north-south. The central region's rate of star formation seems to have been relatively constant across time (Martínez-Delgado et al. 1999). In 1999, St-Germain et al. discovered a H I region of about 105  just to the west of Phoenix. Its radial velocity is −23 km/s and may be physically associated with Phoenix if it is found to have a similar radial velocity.

References

External links 
 
 

Irregular galaxies
Dwarf irregular galaxies
Phoenix (constellation)
06830
?